Liu Lan is a Chinese swimmer. She has won several gold medals.

Medals
Gold medal in the Girls' 50 metre butterfly event at the 2009 Asian Youth Games
Gold medal in the Girls' 50 metre butterfly event at the 2010 Summer Youth Olympics
Gold medal in the Mixed 4 x 100 metre freestyle relay event at the 2010 Summer Youth Olympics
Gold medal in the Girls' 4 x 100 metre freestyle relay event at the 2010 Summer Youth Olympics
Gold medal in the Girls' 100 metre butterfly event at the 2010 Summer Youth Olympics
Gold medal in the Mixed 4 x 100 metre medley relay event at the 2010 Summer Youth Olympics
Bronze medal in the Girls' 200 metre butterfly event at the 2010 Summer Youth Olympics

References

   
 
 

Living people
Swimmers at the 2010 Summer Youth Olympics
Chinese female butterfly swimmers
Asian Games medalists in swimming
Swimmers at the 2014 Asian Games
Medalists at the 2014 Asian Games
Asian Games bronze medalists for China
Year of birth missing (living people)
Youth Olympic gold medalists for China
21st-century Chinese women